Kim Ji-yeon (born October 18, 1992), often anglicized Ji Yeon Kim, is a South Korean mixed martial artist (MMA). She was the Jewels and Gladiator women's bantamweight champion. She competes in the Women's Flyweight division of the Ultimate Fighting Championship.

Background
Kim was born and raised in Incheon, South Korea. She started training in the 8th grade after seeing a kickboxing match on television, which set off her desire for a career in combat sports. She also wrestled in the junior middle school and high school in her native South Korea.

Mixed martial arts career

Early career 
Kim started her professional MMA career in 2013 and fought primarily in South Korea and Japan. Kim acquired a six-fight winning streak and became the Jewels and Gladiator women's bantamweight champion prior to joining the UFC.

Ultimate Fighting Championship
Kim made her UFC debut on June 17, 2017. Kim faced Lucie Pudilová at UFC Fight Night: Holm vs. Correia in Singapore. She lost the fight via unanimous decision.

Kim next faced Justine Kish on January 27, 2018, at UFC on Fox: Jacaré vs. Brunson. She won the fight via split decision.

Her third fight came on June 23, 2018, at UFC Fight Night: Cerrone vs. Edwards against Melinda Fábián.  She won the fight via split decision.

Kim faced Antonina Shevchenko, replacing injured Ashlee Evans-Smith, on November 30, 2018 at The Ultimate Fighter 28 Finale. At the weigh-ins, Kim weighed in at 130.5 pounds, 4.5 pounds over the flyweight non-title fight limit of 126. She was fined 20 percent of her  purse, which went to her opponent Shevchenko. The bout proceeded at catchweight. She lost the fight via unanimous decision.

Kim faced Nadia Kassem  on October 6, 2019 at UFC 243. At the weigh-ins, Kim weighed in at 128 pounds, 2 pound over the flyweight non-title fight limit of 126.  Kim was fined 30% of her  purse, which went to her opponent Kassem. She won the fight via technical knockout in round two.

Kim was scheduled to face Sabina Mazo on December 21, 2019 on UFC on ESPN+ 23. However, on November 1, 2019, it was reported that Kim was forced to pull from the event due to undisclosed injury.

Kim was scheduled to face Alexa Grasso on June 27, 2020 at UFC on ESPN: Poirier vs. Hooker. However, due to travel restrictions for both fighters due to COVID-19 pandemic, the bout was rescheduled on August 29, 2020 at UFC Fight Night 175. She lost the fight via unanimous decision.

Kim was scheduled to face Poliana Botelho on May 1, 2021 at UFC on ESPN 23. However, Kim pulled out of the fight on March 22 citing injury and was replaced by Mayra Bueno Silva.

Kim faced Molly McCann on September 4, 2021 at UFC Fight Night 191. She lost the fight via unanimous decision. The back-and-forth bout won both contestants the Fight of the Night bonus award.

Kim was scheduled to face Poliana Botelho on January 22, 2022 at UFC 270, but Botelho pulled out instead and the pairing was scrapped.

Kim faced Priscila Cachoeira on February 26, 2022 at UFC Fight Night 202. She lost the bout via controversial unanimous decision. 14 out of 15 media scored Kim as the winner of the fight. Along with Cachoeira, Kim was awarded the Fight of the Night bonus award; her second overall.

Kim was scheduled to face Mariya Agapova at UFC 277 on July 30, 2022. However, Agapova was forced out of the fight due to knee injury and she was replaced by Joselyne Edwards. She lost the fight via split decision.

Kim was scheduled to face Mandy Böhm on February 4, 2023, at UFC Fight Night 218. However, Böhm was forced to withdraw before the event start due to illness and the bout was cancelled. The pair was rebook for UFC Fight Night 224.

Championships and accomplishments

Mixed martial arts 
 Ultimate Fighting Championship
 Fight of the Night (Two times) 
 Jewels (mixed martial arts)
 Jewels Bantamweight Champion (One time) vs. Takayo Hashi
 Gladiator 
 Gladiator Bantamweight Champion (One time) vs. Miki Miyauchi

Mixed martial arts record

|-
|Loss
|align=center|9–6–2
|Joselyne Edwards
|Decision (split)
|UFC 277
|
|align=center|3
|align=center|5:00
|Dallas, Texas, United States
|
|-
|Loss
|align=center|9–5–2
|Priscila Cachoeira
|Decision (unanimous)
|UFC Fight Night: Makhachev vs. Green
|
|align=center|3
|align=center|5:00
|Las Vegas, Nevada, United States
|
|-
|Loss
|align=center|9–4–2
|Molly McCann
|Decision (unanimous)
|UFC Fight Night: Brunson vs. Till 
|
|align=center|3
|align=center|5:00
|Las Vegas, Nevada, United States
|
|-
|Loss
|align=center|9–3–2
|Alexa Grasso
|Decision (unanimous)
|UFC Fight Night: Smith vs. Rakić
|
|align=center|3
|align=center|5:00
|Las Vegas, Nevada, United States
|
|-
|Win
|align=center|9–2–2
|Nadia Kassem
|KO (punches to the body)
|UFC 243 
|
|align=center|2
|align=center|4:59
|Melbourne, Australia
|
|-
|Loss
|align=center|8–2–2
|Antonina Shevchenko
|Decision (unanimous)
|The Ultimate Fighter: Heavy Hitters Finale 
|
|align=center|3
|align=center|5:00
|Las Vegas, Nevada, United States
|   
|-
| Win
| align=center| 8–1–2
| Melinda Fábián
| Decision (split)
| UFC Fight Night: Cerrone vs. Edwards
| 
| align=center| 3
| align=center| 5:00
| Kallang, Singapore
|
|-
| Win
| align=center| 7–1–2
| Justine Kish
| Decision (split)
| UFC on Fox: Jacaré vs. Brunson
| 
| align=center| 3
| align=center| 5:00
| Charlotte, North Carolina, United States
|
|-
| Loss
| align=center| 6–1–2
| Lucie Pudilová
| Decision (unanimous)
| UFC Fight Night: Holm vs. Correia
| 
| align=center| 3
| align=center| 5:00
| Kallang, Singapore
|
|-
| Win
| align=center| 6–0–2
| Tao Li
| Submission (rear-naked choke)
| Top FC 13
| 
| align=center| 2
| align=center| 1:30
| Seoul, South Korea
|
|-
| Win
| align=center| 5–0–2
| Jin Tang
| Decision (unanimous)
| Kunlun Fight: Cage Fight Series 5 / Top FC 11
| 
| align=center| 3
| align=center| 5:00
| Seoul, South Korea
|
|-
| Win
| align=center| 4–0–2
| Takayo Hashi
| Decision (unanimous)
| Deep Jewels 9
| 
| align=center| 3
| align=center| 5;00
| Tokyo, Japan
|
|-
| Win
| align=center| 3–0–2
| Hatice Ozyurt
| Submission (armbar)
| Road FC 23
| 
| align=center| 2
| align=center| 1:14
| Seoul, South Korea
|
|-
| Win
| align=center| 2–0–2
| Miki Miyauchi
| TKO (knees and punches)
| Gladiator 81
| 
| align=center| 2
| align=center| 0:18
| Tokyo, Japan
| 
|-
| Win
| align=center| 1–0–2
| Yukimi Kamikaze
| Submission (rear-naked choke)
| Road FC 18
| 
| align=center| 1
| align=center| 1:57
| Seoul, South Korea
|
|-
|Draw
| align=center| 0–0–2
| Takayo Hashi
| Draw (unanimous)
| Road FC: Korea vs. Japan
| 
| align=center| 2
| align=center| 5:00
| Seoul, South Korea
| 
|-
|Draw
| align=center| 0–0–1
| Shizuka Sugiyama
| Draw (Majority)
| Deep: Cage Impact 2013
| 
| align=center| 2
| align=center| 5:00
| Tokyo, Japan
|
|-

See also
List of current UFC fighters
List of female mixed martial artists
 Deep champions

References

External links
 
 

Living people
1989 births
Flyweight mixed martial artists
South Korean hapkido practitioners
South Korean practitioners of Brazilian jiu-jitsu
Female Brazilian jiu-jitsu practitioners
South Korean female mixed martial artists
Bantamweight mixed martial artists
South Korean sanshou practitioners
Sportspeople from Incheon
Ultimate Fighting Championship female fighters
Mixed martial artists utilizing sanshou
Mixed martial artists utilizing hapkido
Mixed martial artists utilizing Brazilian jiu-jitsu